Felipe Ignacio Seymour Dobud (born 23 July 1987) is a Chilean professional footballer who plays as a defensive midfielder for Chilean Primera División club Universidad de Chile.

Club career

Early career
Born in Pirque, Santiago, Chile, Seymour began his football career on a Chilean reality television show called Adidas Selection Team. On the show, players from different professional clubs' youth squads were joined together to form a team to play against different schools in the Chilean Metropolitan area. The team beat all the schools it played except the last, which was San Ignacio. San Ignacio beat "Team Adidas" with five goals scored by Felipe Seymour. After that Seymour was signed by the Universidad de Chile's youth squad.

In 2005, after Adidas Reality, Seymour began his career on the youth squad of Universidad de Chile at age 17.

Universidad de Chile

His Universidad de Chile professional debut was in late 2006 against Palestino.

Under the management of Arturo Salah, Seymour was on the bench for most games, but on 21 October, he came off the bench in the Chilean football derby (called "Superclásico") against Colo-Colo. In 2008, his status as a substitute did not change. In Apertura 2008 he played in only five matches where he came off the bench. In Copa Chile 2008–09, he played in the starting lineup against the Santiago Wanderers in a 1–0 away loss in Estadio Regional Chiledeportes.

After the resignation of Arturo Salah and the arrival of Sergio Markarian, Seymour had more continuity in the starting lineup, and a good season for both him and the team resulted in a victory in Torneo Apertura 2009. Then with the arrival of Jose Basualdo, Seymour was frequently in the starting lineup. In Clásico Universitario he scored a goal against Universidad Católica in a 3–2 home loss.

In 2010 with the arrival of the Uruguayan coach Gerardo Pelusso, he became a key player for the club.

In Copa Libertadores 2010, he scored two long-distance goals. One took place against Flamengo in Estadio Monumental David Arellano in a 2–1 home victory in front of 30,000 spectators. The other was in a game against Alianza Lima in the last minute in the round of 16 for Copa Libertadores, when the team was losing on the global result. He was in matches on other occasions, against Huachipato on 9 February for the fourth week in Estadio Francisco Sánchez Rumoroso in a 3–0 home victory, and Cobresal on 5 September for the twenty-second week in Estadio El Cobre in a 2–1 away victory.

Genoa
In May 2011, the Italian diary Gazzetta dello sport officially confirmed the transfer of the Chilean midfielder to Serie A outfit, Genoa C.F.C. He has been compared with David Pizarro of Roma by the Italian press. Seymour made his Genoa debut on September 18, 2011 against S.S. Lazio, in a match won by Genoa by a score of 2–1. He played the whole 90 minutes. Seymour made 12 league appearances for Genoa in his first 5 months at the club, before being loaned to Calcio Catania for the remainder of the 2011-12 Serie A season.

On 31 January 2012 Seymour moved to Calcio Catania on a season long loan deal that expired on 30 June 2012, later went to Spezia and in 2014 signed a contract with the current Brazilian champion Cruzeiro.

Cruzeiro
After six months without a contract, the player received a very good proposal to return to South America, specifically play in Brazil. Signed with Cruzeiro Esporte Clube that comes from winning two consecutive national championships.

International career
Felipe Seymour has been selected to play for Chile U23 in a tournament in Kuala Lumpur, Malaysia against teams from Oceania. It is rumored that in the game against Ecuador, Felipe Seymour was nominated but not selected, though Marcelo Bielsa considered him as an alternate.

Honours

Club
Universidad de Chile
Primera División (2): 2009 Apertura, 2011 Apertura

References

External links
 
 
 Profile on Goal.com

1987 births
Living people
Chilean people of Swiss descent
Footballers from Santiago
Association football midfielders
Chilean footballers
Chile international footballers
Universidad de Chile footballers
Genoa C.F.C. players
Catania S.S.D. players
A.C. ChievoVerona players
Spezia Calcio players
Cruzeiro Esporte Clube players
CR Vasco da Gama players
Unión Española footballers
Unión La Calera footballers
O'Higgins F.C. footballers
Chilean Primera División players
Serie A players
Serie B players
Campeonato Brasileiro Série A players
Chilean expatriate footballers
Expatriate footballers in Italy
Chilean expatriate sportspeople in Italy
Expatriate footballers in Brazil
Chilean expatriate sportspeople in Brazil